Humboldtine is a rarely occurring mineral from the mineral class of "organic compounds" with the chemical composition FeC2O4•2H2O and is therefore a water-containing iron(II) oxalate or the iron salt of oxalic acid.

Humboldtine crystallizes in the monoclinic crystal system, but only rarely develops well-formed, tabular to prismatic crystals with a resin-like sheen on the surfaces. It is mostly found in the form of botryoidal or fibrous to earthy aggregates and crusty coatings from dull yellow to brownish yellow or amber yellow in color. It can be transparent to opaque. It can form from hematite in oxalic acid.

With a Mohs hardness of 1.5 to 2, humboldtine is one of the softest minerals and can be scratched with a fingernail.

Etymology and history
Humboldtine was first discovered by August Breithaupt in a weathered brown coal deposit near the municipality of Korozluky in Okres Most in the Czech Republic and described in 1821 by Mariano Eduardo de Rivero y Ustariz (1798-1857), who named the mineral after the German naturalist Alexander von Humboldt.

The mineral was already known and characterized when the IMA was founded (1959). Accordingly, humboldtine is listed as an officially recognized mineral.

Crystal structure
Humboldtine crystallizes monoclinically in the space group C2/c (space group no. 15) with the lattice parameters a = 12.011 Å; b = 5.557 Å; c = 9.920 Å and β = 128.53°, with four formula units per unit cell.

References

Minerals
Organic minerals
Monoclinic minerals
Oxalate minerals
Iron(II) minerals
Minerals described in 1821